The Opening of Misty Beethoven is an American pornographic comedy film released in 1976. It was produced with a relatively high budget and filmed on elaborate locations in Paris, New York City and Rome with a musical score, and owes much to its director Radley Metzger (directing this film as "Henry Paris"). According to author Toni Bentley, The Opening of Misty Beethoven is considered the "crown jewel" of the Golden Age of Porn (1969–1984).

Plot
An adult erotic take on George Bernard Shaw 1913 play Pygmalion, and its 1956 musical adaptation My Fair Lady, the film follows a sexologist who tries transforming a low-skilled prostitute into a goddess of passion. Her instruction includes seducing a gay male art dealer (played by gay porn actor Casey Donovan), pleasing three men at once, pegging a man, and similar sexual conquests. Shaw's character of Henry Higgins here becomes the sexologist Dr. Seymour Love, played by Jamie Gillis. Shaw's character of Eliza Doolittle here becomes Dolores "Misty" Beethoven, played by Constance Money. Shaw's Colonel Pickering here becomes Geraldine Rich, played by Jacqueline Beudant. As events unfold, Misty achieves "elevation" better than Love and Rich had hoped, and then cuts them off. Misty returns however, running the "school" and taking over for Dr. Love, leaving him in a very subservient position.

Cast
 Constance Money as Misty Beethoven
 Jamie Gillis as Dr. Seymour Love
 Calvin Culver (aka Casey Donovan) as Jacque Beudant, art dealer
 Jacqueline Beudant as Geraldine Rich
 Gloria Leonard as Barbara Layman
 Terri Hall as Tanya
 Mark Margolis as unhappy man

Notes
The film was released during the Golden Age of Porn (inaugurated by the 1969 release of Andy Warhol Blue Movie) and the phenomenon of "porno chic" in the United States, in which adult erotic films were just beginning to be widely released, publicly discussed by celebrities (such as Johnny Carson and Bob Hope) and taken seriously by film critics (such as Roger Ebert).

In this Golden Age era, most films of the time were expected to have at least minimal plots. Mistys plot was more elaborate than most; it was based directly on George Bernard Shaw's play, Pygmalion, as well as the Broadway and Hollywood success My Fair Lady. Some historians assess The Opening of Misty Beethoven as attaining a mainstream level in storyline and sets. Author Toni Bentley called the film the "crown jewel" of the Golden Age. The film is also satirical, with many added comic touches and dialogue designed for laughs. It includes Mark Margolis's first role. The Opening of Misty Beethoven has the distinction of being the first widely released porn movie to feature female-on-male pegging.

The Italian Edition by Noctuno is an extended version of Misty Beethoven with footage not seen in the original film. Some of the extra footage was used in Barbara Broadcast (Misty's bondage sequence) and Maraschino Cherry (Misty with the matador). All other cutting room floor footage can be found in the Distribpix Misty Beethoven DVD extras. The film was initially rejected for UK cinema by the BBFC and released in a heavily pre-edited form with an additional 1 min 55 secs of censor cuts in 1983. The fully uncut hardcore print was passed with an R18 rating by the BBFC in 2005. It is rumored that the full uncut version was released in the U.S on Laser Disc by Lorimar Home Video. It was also said the Laser Disc Print runs at 87 minutes and has 1:33 ratio. The cool (softcore) version adds several scenes to pad the running time. They include: the servants celebrating at the Italian villa in cave-person outfits, Lawrence and Barbara watching Kojak on TV, Misty and Geraldine together in a tub and, last but not least, cigar guy's female partner on the plane talking to a dejected Seymour Love.

According to reviewer Steve Gallagher, Radley Metzger's films, including those made during the Golden Age of Porn (1969–1984), are noted for their "lavish design, witty screenplays, and a penchant for the unusual camera angle". Claire Simpson noted that his films were "highly artistic — and often cerebral ... and often featured gorgeous cinematography". Film and audio works by Metzger have been added to the permanent collection of the Museum of Modern Art (MoMA) in New York City.

2012 restoration
In 2012, DistribPix oversaw a complete restoration of the film, with the full cooperation of the director. The result had a limited exhibition in theaters, but the main outcome of the project was the first-ever official DVD and Blu-ray releases.

Awards
Awards from the Adult Film Association of America:
 Best Picture
 Best Director (Radley Metzger as "Henry Paris")
 Best Actor (Jamie Gillis)
 Best Screenplay (Radley Metzger as "Jake Barnes")
 Best Editing (Bonnie Karrin)

Other awards
 2002 AVN Award - "Best Classic DVD"
 The film was one of the first to be inducted into the XRCO Hall of Fame.

Music soundtrack

During the 2012 restoration of the film, a fully annotated CD soundtrack was released.

Remake
In 2004, Misty Beethoven: The Musical!, a musical remake, was released. It featured Sunset Thomas, Randy Spears, Julie Meadows, Asia Carrera, Chloe, Dave Cummings, Mike Horner, Evan Stone and Tyce Bune. It was directed by Veronica Hart. The film won the 2004 XRCO Award for "Best Comedy or Parody" and the 2005 AVN Award for "Best Sex Comedy".

See also

 Andy Warhol filmography
 Erotic art
 Erotic films in the United States
 Erotic photography
 Golden Age of Porn
 List of American films of 1976
 Sex in film
 Unsimulated sex

References

Further reading
 
 Heffernan, Kevin, "A social poetics of pornography", Quarterly Review of Film and Video, Volume 15, Issue 3, December 1994, pp. 77–83. .
 Lehman, Peter, Pornography: film and culture, Rutgers depth of field series, Rutgers University Press, 2006, .
 Williams, Linda, Hard core: power, pleasure, and the "frenzy of the visible", University of California Press, 1999, .

External links

 The Opening of Misty Beethoven at MUBI (related to The Criterion Collection)
 
 

American pornographic films
American sex comedy films
Films based on works by George Bernard Shaw
Films directed by Radley Metzger
Films scored by Alessandro Alessandroni
Gay-related films
Male bisexuality in film
1976 films
1970s pornographic films
1970s sex comedy films
1976 comedy films
Films shot in New York City
Films shot in Paris
Films shot in Rome
1970s English-language films
1970s American films